Guangdong-Hong Kong Cup 1979–80 is the 2nd staging of this two-leg competition between Hong Kong and Guangdong.

The first leg was played in Hong Kong Stadium on 30 December 1979 while the second leg was played in Guangzhou on 13 January 1980.

Hong Kong captured the champion for their first time by winning an aggregate 1–0.

Squads

Hong Kong
The team consists of 19 players. Some of the players include:
 Ma Bit Hung 馬必雄
 Leung Sui Wing 梁帥榮
 Lai Sun Cheung 黎新祥
 Choi York Yee 蔡育瑜
 Ma Tin Hung 馬天雄
 Chan Fat Chi 陳發枝
 Wu Kwok Hung 胡國雄
 Tsang Ting Fai 曾廷輝
 Cheung Ka Ping 張家平
 Chung Chor Wai 鍾楚維
 Lau Wing Yip 劉榮業
 Sze Wai Shan 施維山
 Li Kwai Hung 李桂雄
 Lo Fuk Hing 盧福興
 Wong Kwok On 黃國安
 Chui Kwok On 徐國安

Guangdong
Some of the players in the squad:
 Cai Jinbiao 蔡錦標
 Chen Xirong 陳熙榮
 Rong Zhixing 容志行
 Ou Weiting 歐偉庭
 Yang Ning 楊寧

Results
First Leg

Second Leg

References
 HKFA website 省港盃回憶錄(三) (in chinese)

 

Guan
Guangdong–Hong Kong Cup
1980 in Chinese football